"Past Three O'Clock" (or "Past Three a Clock") is an English Christmas carol, loosely based on the call of the traditional London waits, musicians and watchmen who patrolled during the night, using a musical instrument to show they were on duty and to mark the hours. The refrain dates from at least the early modern period, appearing in print in a 1665 supplement to John Playford's The Dancing Master.

The words were written by George Ratcliffe Woodward (1848–1934) to the traditional tune "London Waits". Woodward added lines to the traditional refrain in a style characteristic of his delight in archaic poetry. It was published in A Cambridge Carol Book: Being Fifty-two Songs for Christmas, Easter and Other Seasons in 1924.

Numerous variations of the carol include an arrangement by William Llewellyn as a "quodlibet" for choir: London Waits (Past Three O'clock).

Recordings of the carol include those by the Choir of Clare College, Cambridge, the Choir of King's College, Cambridge, the Monteverdi Choir., the Renaissance Singers, James Galway and the National Philharmonic Orchestra and The Chieftains on the album The Bells of Dublin, (1991). It features in the third movement of Patric Standford's A Christmas Carol Symphony (1978).

Popular music artists who have recorded the carol include Linda Ronstadt on the album A Merry Little Christmas (2000) and Chris Squire on the album Chris Squire's Swiss Choir (2007).

See also
List of Christmas carols

References

External links 
The Cambridge Carol-Book: Being Fifty-Two Songs for Easter, Christmas, and Other Seasons (with scans of original)

1924 songs
20th-century hymns
Christmas carols
English Christian hymns